The Grupo Desportivo Milheiroense is a Portuguese football (soccer) club in the parish of Rio Meão, municipality of Santa Maria da Feira, the district of Aveiro.  The team currently plays in the third division of the district of Aveiro.

The club was founded on October 23, 1975.  Its current president is Edgar Perestrelo Lima.

Presidents

 1975–1976:  Serafim Tavares  2nd district division
 1976–1977:  Licínio Pina  2nd district division
 1977–1978:  Valdemar Pinho  2nd district division
 1978–1979:  Manuel Ferreira  1st district division
 1979–1980:  José Campos  1st district division
 1980–1981:  Augusto Casimiro  1st district division
 1981–1982:  Augusto Casimiro  1st district division
 1982–1983:  Augusto Casimiro  1st district division
 1983–1984:  César Lisboa  1st district division
 1984–1985:  Alfredo de Azevedo  2nd district division
 1985–1986:  Alfredo de Azevedo  1st district division
 1986–1987:  Joaquim Lima  1st district division
 1987–1988:  Rui  1st district division
 1988–1989:  Adriano Martins  1st district division
 1989–1990:  Armando Lima Oliveira  1st district division
 1990–1991:  Manuel Lima 1st district division
 1991–1992:  António Costa  1st district division
 1992–1993:  Manuel Lima  2nd district division
 1993–1994:  José Rocha  1st district division
 1994–1995:  Adriano Martins  1st district division
 1995–1996:  Adriano Martins  1st district division
 1996–1997:  Arménio Pinho  1st district division
 1997–1998:  António Ferreira  1st district division
 1998–1999:  Arménio Pinho  1st district division
 1999–2000:  Arménio Pinho 1st district division
 2000–2001:  Arménio Pinho  1st district division
 2001–2002:  Arménio Pinho  3rd National division
 2002–2003:  Arménio Pinho  3rd National division
 2003–2004:  Arménio Pinho  3rd National division
 2004–2005:  Edgar Perestrelo  3rd National division
 2005–2006:  Edgar Perestrelo  3rd National division
 2006–2007:  Edgar Perestrelo  3rd National division

League

 National Third Division (2006–2007)

Participation

 Aveiro District First Division: 1991/92
 Aveiro Honra DivisionL 2000/2001
 National First Division 1980/1981

Stadium

The team home ground is the Complexo Desportivo de Milheirós de Poiares and it features a natural turf surface.

Equipments

The official kit used by the team is made by Patrick and "Irmãos Tavares Lda." are the sponsors.

External links
 Official website

Milheiroense
Sport in Santa Maria da Feira
Association football clubs established in 1975
1975 establishments in Portugal